Masterplots is a reference book series which summarizes the plots of significant works of literature and films. The first edition was published in 1949 by Frank N. Magill of Salem Press. It remains the flagship product of the publisher.

The series offers 12,000 reference articles focusing on plot summaries, critical commentary, character profiles, literary settings and biographical profiles. In addition to the complete Fourth Edition, volumes are available on African American Literature, American Fiction Series, British & Commonwealth Fiction, Christian Literature, Drama, Juvenile & Young Adult Literature, Nonfiction, Poetry, Short Stories, and Women's Literature.

References

External links
Masterplots via Salem Press

Series of non-fiction books
1949 non-fiction books